The following is a timeline of the history of the city of Mobile, Alabama, USA.

Prior to 19th century

 1702 - Fort Louis de la Mobile founded by Jean-Baptiste Le Moyne de Bienville of Montreal.
 1703 - Mardi Gras begins.
 1722 - French Louisiana capital relocated from Mobile to New Orleans.
 1723 - Fort Conde built.
 1763 - Mobile becomes part of British West Florida per Treaty of Paris (1763).
 1780 - March: Battle of Fort Charlotte; Spanish in power.
 1783 - Mobile becomes part of Spanish West Florida per Treaty of Paris (1783).

19th century

 1810 - Mobile becomes part of the independent Republic of West Florida.
 1813
 Spanish West Florida annexed to the United States.
 Mobile Gazette newspaper begins publication.
 1814 - Town of Mobile incorporated.
 1819 - City of Mobile incorporated.
 1821 - Mobile Commercial Register begins publication.
 1823 - Christ Church Cathedral established.
 1827 - Fire.
 1829 - Mobile Female Benevolent Society founded.
 1830
 Spring Hill College and City Hospital  established.
 Population: 3,194.
 1835 - Franklin Society Reading Room and Library founded.
 1839
 October 2: Fire.
 Barton Academy construction completed.
 1840
 St. Francis Street Methodist Church founded.
 Population: 12,672.
 1842 - United States Marine Hospital completed.
 1844 - Shaarai Shomayim congregation formed.
 1845 - Trinity Episcopal Church established.
 1850
 Mobile Evening News begins publication.
 Population: 20,515.
 Bienville Square (city park) established.
 1852
 Public schooling begins in Barton Academy building.
 Mobile and Ohio Railroad opened.
 1854 - Mobile Area Chamber of Commerce chartered.
 1855 - Publisher S.H. Goetzel in business (approximate date).
 1857 - City Hall built.
 1860 - Population: 29,258.
 1861 - City becomes part of the Confederate States of America.
 1864
 Wilmer Hall established.
 (August 5) Battle of Mobile Bay.
 1865 - State colored convention held in city.
 1868 - Africatown established near Mobile.
 1869 - Mobile Bar Association and Mobile Law Library founded.
 1871 - Mobile Cotton Exchange established.
 1872 - Mobile Carnival Association established.
 1883
 Fidelia Club formed.
 Drago Band (musical group) active (approximate date).
 1889 - Mobile County Courthouse built.
 1890
 Mobile Camera Club founded.
 Population: 31,076.
 1894 - Clara Schumann Club (music group) formed.
 1900 - Population: 38,469.

20th century

 1902 - Mobile Public Library established.
 1906 - (27 September) Mobile swept by a hurricane.
 1907 - Union Depot built.
 1910 - Population: 51,521.
 1914 - Rotary Club of Mobile organized.
 1918 - Alabama Dry Dock and Shipbuilding Company in business.
 1925 - Lincoln Theatre built.
 1927 - Saenger Theatre built.
 1928 - Terminal Railway Alabama State Docks founded.
 1929
 Mobile Press newspaper begins publication.
 Woman's Clubhouse Association founded.
 1930 - WALA radio begins broadcasting.
 1936 - American Association of University Women of Mobile organized.
 1937
 Foreign trade zone established.
 Aluminum Ore Company refining plant constructed.
 1940 - Population: 78,720.
 1950 - Population: 129,009.
 1953
 WALA-TV (television) begins broadcasting.
 Consular Corps of Mobile organized (approximate date).
 1955 - WKRG-TV (television) begins broadcasting.
 1960
 Sister city agreement established with Puerto Barrios, Guatemala.
 Population: 202,779.
 1962 - Mobile Genealogical Society founded.
 1964 - Mobile British Women's Club active (approximate date).
 1965 - Sister city agreement established with Málaga, Spain.
 1966 - Neighborhood Organized Workers established.
 1974
 Azalea City News begins publication.
 Sister city agreement established with Pau, France.
 1975 - Springhill Medical Center (then called Springhill Memorial Hospital) opens.
 1976 - City twins with Worms, Germany.
 1980
 U.S. Supreme Court decides Mobile v. Bolden redistricting-related lawsuit.
 Sister city agreement established with Kaohsiung, Taiwan.
 1982 - Sister city agreement established with Zakynthos, Greece (approximate date).
 1983 - Mobile Municipal Archives founded.
 1985 - U.S. Naval Station Mobile opens.
 1987 - Ascension Providence (hospital) built.
 1988 - Sister city agreement established with Rostov on Don, Russia.
 1989
 Sister city agreement established with Pyeongtaek, South Korea.
 Mike Dow becomes mayor.
 1990 - Sister city agreement established with Katowice, Poland.
 1992 - Sister city agreement established with Košice, Slovakia.
 1993
 September 22: 1993 Big Bayou Canot train wreck.
 Sister city agreement established with Havana, Cuba, and Ichihara, Japan.
 1995
 City website online (approximate date).
 Bayfest (Mobile) (music festival) begins.
 1998 - Sammy’s v. City of Mobile strip club-related lawsuit decided.

21st century

 2002 - Tricentennial of founding of Mobile.
 2005
 Sam Jones becomes first African-American in city elected mayor.
 City twins with Cockburn, Australia, and establishes sister city agreement with Bolinao, Philippines.
 2010 - Population: 195,111.
 2012 - Christmas tornado outbreak.
 2015 - Bayfest is cancelled.

See also
 History of Mobile, Alabama
 List of mayors of Mobile, Alabama
 National Register of Historic Places listings in Mobile, Alabama
 Timelines of other cities in Alabama: Birmingham, Huntsville, Montgomery, Tuscaloosa

References

Bibliography

Published in the 19th century

Published in the 20th century
 
 
 
 
  Map
 
 
 
 
 
 
 
 
 Bergeron, Arthur W. Confederate Mobile. Jackson: University Press of Mississippi, 1991.
 Higganbotham, Jay. Old Mobile: Fort Louis de la Louisiane, 1702–1711. Tuscaloosa: University of Alabama Press, 1991.
 
  (fulltext)

Published in the 21st century
 
 Fitzgerald, Michael W. Urban Emancipation: Popular Politics in Reconstruction Mobile, 1860–1890. Baton Rouge: Louisiana State University Press, 2002.
 Pride, Richard. The Political Use of Racial Narratives: School Desegregation in Mobile, Alabama, 1954–1997. Urbana: University of Illinois Press, 2002.

External links

 
 
 
 
 . Materials related to Mobile, Ala.
 Items related to Mobile, Alabama, various dates (via Digital Public Library of America)
 Map of Mobile, 1815
 Materials related to Mobile, Alabama, various dates (via US Library of Congress, Prints & Photos Division)
 Materials related to Mobile, Alabama, various dates (via New York Public Library, Digital Collections)
 Back in the Day in Mobile County - Free genealogy records, family stories, area descriptions and information on Mobile historical sites.

 
Mobile
Years in Alabama